The 2010 Barrow-in-Furness Borough Council election took place on 6 May 2010 to elect members of Barrow-in-Furness Borough Council in Cumbria, England. One third of the council was up for election and the council stayed under no overall control.

After the election, the composition of the council was:
Labour 16
Conservative 13
Independent 5
Socialist People's Party 2

Background
The 2010 election was the last where only a third of the council was contested. This meant 12 seats were up for election, with only Barrow Island ward not having an election. From the 2011 election Barrow-in-Furness moved to having full council elections every 4 years.

Before the election the Conservative party had 16 councillors, compared to 8 for Labour, 7 independents, 4 Socialist People's Party and 1 Liberal Democrat. However, in the lead up to election independent councillor John Millar joined the Conservatives and defended Dalton South as a Conservative in the election.

The Conservatives hoped to win a majority on the council, defending their record as the council administration by pointing to a list of achievements and saying they had kept council tax levels low. However Labour were only defending 2 seats and attacked the Conservative record, while calling for more council apprenticeships and the return of a scheme of lower bus fares for pensioners.

Election result
The results saw Labour gain 8 seats to double the number of councillors the party held on the council to 16. The gains came at the expense of all the other groups on the council, with only the Conservatives holding 2 seats in Hawcoat and Roosecote.

Following the election the Conservative leader of the council, Jack Richardson, was re-elected and Conservative Rory McClure became mayor. This came after all 5 independents backed the Conservatives in the vote and the 2 Socialist Peoples Party councillors abstained.

Ward results

References

2010 English local elections
May 2010 events in the United Kingdom
Barrow-in-Furness Borough Council elections
2010s in Cumbria